Fernando de Parias Merry (27 July 1937 – 31 October 2021) was a Spanish politician. A member of the FET y de las JONS, he served as Mayor of Seville and on the Cortes Españolas from 1975 until its disbanding in 1977. He voted in favor of the Political Reform Act and headed the Seville city council's transition to democracy.

References

1937 births
2021 deaths
Spanish politicians
Mayors of Seville
FET y de las JONS politicians
Members of the Cortes Españolas